Baqerabad Meyanrud (also Romanized as Bāqerābād Meyānrūd) is a village in Poshtdarband Rural District, in the Central District of Kermanshah County, Kermanshah Province, Iran. At the 2006 census, its population was 56, in 13 families.

References 

Populated places in Kermanshah County